The 2019 season is Home United's 24th consecutive season in the top flight of Singapore football and in the Singapore Premier League. Along with the Singapore Premier League, the club will also compete in the Singapore Cup.

Key events

Pre-season 
 On 26/9/2018, it was reported that Geylang International is interested in bringing Song Ui-young to Bedok Stadium together with their former coach, Lee Lim Saeng for Season 2019.  Joining the Eagles to express interest is Indonesian giants Persija Jakarta.
 On 26/9/2018, it was reported that Aidil Shahril is courted by Perak FA for 2019 while their former coach Lee Lim Saeng is also a target for Warriors FC.
 On 5/10/2018, it was reported that Aidil Shahril is courted by Kedah FA of Malaysia, Ceres–Negros of Philippines, Ports FC of Thailand and Persija Jakarta of Indonesia.
 On 8/10/2018, Shakir Hamzah was banned for 4 AFC Cup matches by AFC.com for using offensive, insulting or abusive language and/or gestures towards the match Official after being sentoff in the match against 4.25. He is also fined US$5000. 
 On 9/10/2018, it was confirmed that Aidil Sharin had left Home United to take top role at Kedah FA.
 On 30/10/2018, Shahrin Saberin officially leave Home United after his contract ended to join the Eagles for 2019.  He is followed by Amy Recha.
 On 31/10/2018, Song Ui-young says no to US$20,000 a month offer from Persija Jakarta to stay with the team.
 On 9/11/2018, Shakir Hamzah was reported to have been offered a one-year offer from former Malaysia Cup champions Kedah FA

In-season 
 On 19/4/2019, newly appointed coach, Saswadimata Dasuki leaves the club after a dismal start to the season. Assistant coach Noh Rahman takes over as interim head coach.
 On 2/7/2019, former national football coach Raddy Avramovic returns to Singapore as the head coach of Home United.
 On 17/8/2019, Raddy Avramovic steps down as head coach of Home United Football Club due to health reasons. Assistant coach Noh Rahman reprises his role as interim head coach

Squad

S.League squad

U19 squad

Coaching staff

Transfer

Pre-season transfer

In

Out

Retained

Extension

Promoted

Trial

Trial (In)

Trial (Out)

Friendlies

Pre-season friendlies

Tour of Malaysia (18 to 27 January)

Team statistics

Appearances and goals

Note 1: Ho Wai Loon scored an own goal in AFC Champions League qualifier against Persijia Jakarta.

Competitions

Overview

Charity Shield

Singapore Premier League

AFC Champions League

Qualifying play-off

AFC Cup

Group stage

Singapore Cup

References 

Home United FC seasons
Home United